Wolchon Station is an underground of Line 1 of the Daegu Metro in Dalseo District, Daegu, South Korea.

Features
From this station, you can take the bus route 618 to Daegu Institute of Technology, Bonri-dong, and Cathedral East. There is a Daegu Youth Training Center nearby, and since there is a station at a large range, there is a lot of fluid population around the station, and there are many apartments and schools, so the utilization rate is not very good.

The Daegu Technical University is located near this station, and the exit information is also listed, but the Daegu Technical University is more close to the Seobu Bus Terminal station, but in fact the station with the closest distance from Daegu Technical University is Songhyeon station.

List of exits
There are 8 exits at this station:

External links

 Cyber station information from Daegu Metropolitan Transit Corporation

Daegu Metro stations
Dalseo District
Railway stations opened in 1997